Scawtite is a hydrous calcium silicate mineral with carbonate, formula: Ca7(Si3O9)2CO3·2H2O. It crystallizes in the monoclinic crystal system as thin plates or flat prisms.

Scawtite was first described in 1929 for an occurrence at Scawt Hill in Northern Ireland. 

Scawtite occurs as in skarns and hydrothermal veins in limestone. Associated minerals include melilite, spurrite, tobermorite, thomsonite, larnite, grossular, bultfonteinite, calcite, analcime, foshagite and hillebrandite.

References

Silicate minerals
Monoclinic minerals
Minerals in space group 12